The National Democratic Union of Mozambique was a nationalist organization founded in Salisbury, Southern Rhodesia (present-day Harare, Zimbabwe) in 1960. It was led by Adelino Gwambe and consisted mostly of migrant workers and disgruntled students who had fled central and southern regions of Mozambique. It was formed to oppose Portuguese colonial rule in Mozambique. In June 1962, UDENAMO merged with two other nationalist organizations, the National African Union of Independent Mozambique (UNAMI) and Mozambican African National Union (MANU) to form the Mozambique Liberation Front (FRELIMO).

FRELIMO
1960 establishments in Southern Rhodesia
Defunct political parties in Mozambique
National liberation movements in Africa